Kim Vanreusel (born 4 January 1998) is a Belgian alpine skier. She competed in the women's giant slalom at the 2018 Winter Olympics.

References

1998 births
Living people
Belgian female alpine skiers
Olympic alpine skiers of Belgium
Alpine skiers at the 2018 Winter Olympics
Place of birth missing (living people)
Alpine skiers at the 2016 Winter Youth Olympics